Starships is a miniatures line published by Superior Models, Inc.

Gameplay
Starships is a line of models that were intended for the Starfleet Wars miniatures rules but can used with any science fiction wargames or rule systems.

Reception
Steve Jackson reviewed Starships in The Space Gamer No. 30. Jackson commented that "Highly recommended for space-miniatures fans - especially those who can paint well enough to do justice to the details."

References

See also
List of lines of miniatures

Miniature figures